Moramide intermediate (3-methyl-4-morpholin-4-yl-2,2-diphenylbutanoic acid, on INCB Yellow List as 2-methyl-3-morpholino-1,1-diphenylpropane carboxylic acid) is a moramide precursor scheduled by UN Single Convention on Narcotic Drugs.

In the United States, moramide intermediate is designated as a Schedule II controlled substance, and has an ACSCN of 9802.  The 2014 annual manufacturing quota was nil.

See also 
 Moramide
 Methadone intermediate
 Pethidine intermediate A
 Pethidine intermediate B (norpethidine)
 Pethidine intermediate C (pethidinic acid)

References

Analgesics
4-Morpholinyl compunds